Rutland is a city in Humboldt County, Iowa, United States. The population was 113 at the time of the 2020 census.

History
Rutland was platted in 1869. It was named after Rutland, Vermont.

Rutland was formerly serviced by Iowa Highway 367, which was decommissioned in 1980.

Geography
Rutland is located at  (42.758785, -94.292847) on the West Fork Des Moines River.

Demographics

2010 census
As of the census of 2010, there were 126 people, 63 households, and 37 families residing in the city. The racial makeup of the city was 99.2% White and 0.8% from two or more races.

There were 63 households, of which 15.9% had children under the age of 18 living with them, 47.6% were married couples living together, 6.3% had a female householder with no husband present, 4.8% had a male householder with no wife present, and 41.3% were non-families. 28.6% of all households were made up of individuals, and 15.8% had someone living alone who was 65 years of age or older. The average household size was 2.00 and the average family size was 2.43.

The median age in the city was 49 years. 14.3% of residents were under the age of 18; 10.4% were between the ages of 18 and 24; 20.6% were from 25 to 44; 34.9% were from 45 to 64; and 19.8% were 65 years of age or older. The gender makeup of the city was 50.0% male and 50.0% female.

2000 census
As of the census of 2000, there were 145 people, 64 households, and 40 families residing in the city. The racial makeup of the city was 97.24% White, 0.69% Native American, and 2.07% from two or more races.

There were 64 households, out of which 29.7% had children under the age of 18 living with them, 53.1% were married couples living together, 6.3% had a female householder with no husband present, and 37.5% were non-families. 34.4% of all households were made up of individuals, and 14.1% had someone living alone who was 65 years of age or older. The average household size was 2.27 and the average family size was 2.93.

In the city, the population was spread out, with 24.8% under the age of 18, 6.2% from 18 to 24, 23.4% from 25 to 44, 28.3% from 45 to 64, and 17.2% who were 65 years of age or older. The median age was 42 years. For every 100 females, there were 116.4 males. For every 100 females age 18 and over, there were 98.2 males.

The median income for a household in the city was $30,556, and the median income for a family was $32,321. Males had a median income of $24,375 versus $15,500 for females. The per capita income for the city was $13,432. There were none of the families and 2.7% of the population living below the poverty line, including no under eighteens and 9.1% of those over 64.

Education
The Humboldt Community School District operates public schools. The city is served by Mease Elementary (Dakota City), Taft Elementary School (Humboldt), Humboldt Middle School, and Humboldt High School.

Notable person

Doreen Wilber, archery gold medalist at the 1972 Summer Olympics.

References

Cities in Humboldt County, Iowa
Cities in Iowa